The Bishop's Gaiters women's ice hockey program represents Bishop's University in Sherbrooke, Quebec in the sport of ice hockey in the RSEQ conference of U Sports women's ice hockey. When the Gaiters joined the RSEQ, they became the first-Quebec based program not from the city of Montreal to compete in the conference.

History
Women’s hockey at Bishop’s dates back to 1915. In 1975 and 1976, Bishops hosted the Women's Invitational Hockey Tournament. The 1975 participants also included the Loyola Tommies, University of Toronto and Dawson College. The Loyola Tommies captured the championship, defeating Toronto in the final. The participants for the 1976 Tournament included John Abbott College, University of New Brunswick Red Blazers and Dawson College. John Abbott captured the championship, while Bishop's defeated Dawson College in double overtime for third place.

Recent history has seen the Gaiters undergo significant movement. Members of the Independent Women’s Club Hockey League (IWCHL) in 2016-17, the program would spend the 2017-18 and 2018-19 seasons competing in the American Collegiate Hockey Association (ACHA). Following their sojourn in the ACHA, the Gaiters played an independent schedule in 2019-20. In January 2020, it was announced that the Gaiters were poised to join the RSEQ for the 2020–21 season, benefitting from a lead gift from the Molson Family Foundation, including support from Molson Coors and the Bishop's University Foundation and other donors. The Gaiters home arena was renamed the Jane and Eric Molson Arena. Due to the COVID-19 Pandemic, the 2020–21 season was cancelled.

Gaiters assistant coaches Val Bois and Katia Clement-Heydra formed the Women's Hockey Institute in December 2020, a partnership with Bishop's University and Fonction Optimum, based at the Jane & Eric Molson Arena.

The Gaiters joined the RSEQ conference for the 2021–22 season, becoming the 37th U SPORTS-level women's hockey university team in Canada. Their first game as an official member of the RSEQ conference is scheduled to take place on October 22, 2021, against the Montreal Carabins women's ice hockey program.

Season-by-season Record 
{| class="wikitable"
|-
| style="background:#fea;"|Won Championship
| style="background:#dfd;"|<small>'Lost Championship</small>
| style="background:#d0e7ff;"|Conference Champions
| style="background:#fbb;"|League Leader
|-
|}

Exhibition

|-
!colspan=12 style="background:#582C83;color:#D6D5D5;"| Exhibition
|-

Season team scoring champion

Awards and honours
Team awardsRookie of the Year2017-18: Kayla LeTouzel
2018-19: Miranda Snable
2019-20: Lory LacombeCharles Chapman Award2017-18: Christine Gauthier
2018-19: Arianne Charette
2019-20: Pascale DesmaraisMost Improved Player2017-18: Jessica Briere
2018-19: Meghan McGovern
2019-20: Lory LacombeMost Valuable Player''
2017-18: Kayla LeTouzel
2018-19: Jess Belanger
2019-20: Jess Belanger

University Awards
Hayley Robitaille - Provigo/Robert Lafond Bishop's Athletes of the Week (awarded week ending November 19, 2018)
Danielle Armand - Provigo/Robert Lafond Bishop's Athletes of the Week (awarded week ending October 27, 2019)

References

Bishop's Gaiters
U Sports women's ice hockey teams
Women's ice hockey teams in Canada
Ice hockey teams in Quebec
Women in Quebec